Wang Xue (Chinese: 王雪, born on June 14, 1993 in Jilin) is a Chinese female short track speed skater. She won the gold medal for Ladies' 500 meters in 2013 Winter Universiade, Trentino.

References

External links
 

1993 births
Living people
Chinese female speed skaters
Chinese female short track speed skaters
Universiade medalists in short track speed skating
Universiade gold medalists for China
Competitors at the 2013 Winter Universiade
20th-century Chinese women
21st-century Chinese women